Guy Alexis Lobineau (1666–1727), better known as Dom Lobineau, was a Breton historian and Benedictine monk. He is best known for his history of Brittany, Histoire de Bretagne (1707). He also expanded and completed Michel Félibien's five-volume Histoire de la ville de Paris (1725), after the latter's death in 1719.

References
"Guy Alexis Lobineau", Biographie universelle ancienne et moderne : histoire par ordre alphabétique de la vie publique et privée de tous les hommes avec la collaboration de plus de 300 savants et littérateurs français ou étrangers, 2e édition, 1843-1865. ed. Louis-Gabriel Michaud. Vol 25 pg. 5
 Félibien, Michel (1725). Histoire de la ville de Paris, completed and enlarged by Guy-Alexis Lobineau. Paris: Guillaume Desprez. Volumes 1, 2, 3, 4, and 5 at Google Books. Volumes  1, 2, 3, 4, and 5 at INHA.

18th-century French historians
1666 births
1727 deaths
French Benedictines
French male non-fiction writers